Chenango Bridge is a hamlet in the southern part of the Town of Chenango in Broome County, New York, United States. It lies where State Route 12A (Chenango Bridge Road) crosses the Chenango River. The population was 2,883 at the 2010 census, which lists the community as a census-designated place.

Geography

Demographics

References

Hamlets in New York (state)
Census-designated places in New York (state)
Census-designated places in Broome County, New York
Hamlets in Broome County, New York